The Weldon Memorial Prize, also known as the Weldon Memorial Prize and Medal, is given yearly by the University of Oxford. The prize is to be awarded

without regard to nationality or membership of any University to the person who, in the judgement of the electors, has, in the ten years next preceding the date of the award, published the most noteworthy contribution to the development of mathematical or statistical methods applied to problems in Biology. (Biology shall, for the purposes of this clause, be interpreted as including Zoology, Botany, Anthropology, Sociology, Psychology, and Medical Science.)

It is named in honor of Walter Frank Raphael Weldon, former Linacre Professor of Zoology at the University.  It was established through the efforts of Francis Galton and Karl Pearson. Although intended to be given yearly, it has in the past been given less often.

Recipients

 1911 David Heron
 1912 Karl Pearson
 1914 Charles B. Goring
 1920 J. Arthur Harris
 1920 Ethel M. Elderton
 1923 Johannes Schmidt
 1926 Major Greenwood
 1930 Ronald Aylmer Fisher
 1932 Geoffrey M. Morant
 1935 Egon S. Pearson
 1938 J. B. S. Haldane
 1941 Julia Bell
 1944 Prasanta Chandra Mahalanobis
 1947 Sewall Wright
 1950 Lionel S. Penrose
 1953 Frank Yates
 1956 David J. Finney
 1959 E. B. Ford
 1962 Kenneth Mather
 1965 Motoo Kimura
 1969 I. Michael Lerner
 1971 Maurice S. Bartlett
 1974 David Kendall
 1978 Luca Cavalli-Sforza
 1980 Robert May
 1983 David R. Cox
 1986 Tomoko Ohta
 1989 Roy M. Anderson
 1992 George Oster
 1995 Michael P. Hassell
 1996 Martin Nowak
 1998 John Maynard Smith
 2000 Joseph Felsenstein
 2001 Elizabeth Thompson
 2002 Warren Ewens
 2003 Richard Peto
 2004 David Sankoff
 2005 Geoffrey West
 2006 Nancy Kopell
 2007 Brian Charlesworth
 2008 Peter Donnelly
 2009 David Spiegelhalter
 2010 Russell S. Lande
 2011 David Haussler
 2012 Gil McVean
 2013 Karl Friston
 2014 John McNamara
 2015 David J. Brenner
 2016 Sarah (Sally) P. Otto
 2017 Shripad Tuljapurkar
 2018 Angela McLean
 2019 Stephen W. Pacala
 2020 Simon Myers
 2022 Graham Medley and Julia R. Gog on behalf of the Scientific Pandemic Influenza Group on Modelling, Operational sub-group (SPI-M-O).

References

Awards and prizes of the University of Oxford
British science and technology awards
Lists of people associated with the University of Oxford